Settimo San Pietro, Sètimu in Sardinian language, is a comune (municipality) of the Metropolitan City of Cagliari in the Italian region Sardinia, located about  northeast of Cagliari.

Settimo San Pietro borders the following municipalities: Quartucciu, Selargius, Serdiana, Sestu, Sinnai, Soleminis.

See also
 S'acqua 'e is dolus

References

Cities and towns in Sardinia